The 2012–13 FC St. Gallen season in Swiss Super League.

Sources

Players

Current squad
As of 2 February 2013.

Sources and References 

FC St. Gallen seasons
St. Gallen